The 2010–11 season of the NOFV-Oberliga was the third season of the league at tier five (V) of the German football league system.

The NOFV-Oberliga was split into two divisions, the NOFV-Oberliga Nord and the NOFV-Oberliga Süd. Berliner AK 07 and VfB Germania Halberstadt were promoted to the 2011–12 Regionalliga Nord. Reinickendorfer Füchse, Ludwigsfelder FC and 1. FC Magdeburg II were relegated, as were FC Sachsen Leipzig, having been in administration for the past two years and being dissolved on 30 June 2011. Tennis Borussia Berlin were also relegated after losing in the playoffs.

North

Top goalscorers

South

Top goalscorers

Relegation playoffs 
SC Borea Dresden beat Tennis Borussia Berlin 3–1 over two legs in the relegation playoff to stay in the NOFV-Oberliga for a 16th successive season. Tennis Borussia were relegated to the sixth tier of the German football league, the Berlin-Liga, for the first time in their history.

First leg

Second leg

References

External links 
 NOFV-Online – official website of the North-East German Football Association 

NOFV-Oberliga seasons
NOFV